Furina is a genus of venomous elapid snakes endemic to Australia. It contains five species of which there are no subspecies.

Species

External links

 
Snakes of Australia
Snake genera
Taxa named by André Marie Constant Duméril